Libohovë is a town and a municipality in southern Albania. It is overlooked by Libohovë Castle and has a main street with views across the Drino valley. Libohovë is at the foot of the Bureto Mountain. The region forms part of the Zagori Regional Nature Park located in Zagori region.

The municipality was formed at the 2015 local government reform by the merger of the former municipalities Libohovë, Qendër Libohovë and Zagori, that became municipal units. The seat of the municipality is the town Libohovë. The total population is 3,667 (2011 census), in a total area of 248.42 km2. The population of the former municipality at the 2011 census was 1,992.

History 
The archaeological evidence indicates a very ancient settlement which reached its zenith in the 17th century.
It may be the exact site of present Dropull's former Catholic Diocese of Hadrianopolis in Epiro. In the late 17th century, the Ottoman traveler Evliya Çelebi passed through Libohovë noting it was inhabited by Muslim Albanians and had 200 houses, a mosque, prayer house, inn and small bathhouse. Between 1796-1798 the Libohovë Castle was built in the city. In the early 19th century during the rule of Ali Pasha, British diplomat William Martin Leake during his journey from Vlorë to Gjirokastra and later to present-day Greece, in his diary describes his arrival on December 26, 1804, in the region of Derópoli, or Dropull as it was known from the local Albanians. According to him, Libohovë, then part of the same region, numbered about 1000 Muslim families and 100 Christian families.

It is the home of a well-known Albanian noble family, which shares its name with the town. Prior to the communist era they held considerable sway over the country's politics. The castle is a substantial fortress with four polygonal corner towers and a curtain wall surrounding a wide courtyard. The sister of Ali Pasha of Tepelenë, Shanica, married one of the most important members of the Libohovë family and the castle was the dowry that Ali Pasha presented to her. In the town centre was an old plane tree around which a bar-restaurant has been built. Also in the centre is the house of Myfit (Bey) Libohovë (1876–1927), a renowned politician, the first minister of internal affairs and foreign affairs serving in the Albanian Government of 1912.

During the interwar period (20th century) Libohovë was a well watered, large and wealthy settlement located among extensive groves containing 500 houses, its inhabitants spoke Albanian and were mostly Muslim. Libohovë was a centre for the Muslim Sufi Bektashi order with several tekkes located in Dropull. Muslims formed most of Libohovë's population in the late twentieth century.

Places of interest 
 Libohovë Castle is the most visited site in city.
 Myfit Bej Libohova's home is located in the centre of the city.

Notable locals 
 Eni Çobani, lawyer
 Kadri Gjata, Albanian educator
 Myfit Libohova, Albanian government member on nine occasions from 1912 until his death in 1927, holding the positions of Justice Minister, Minister of the Interior, Minister of Finance, and Minister of Foreign Affairs. He was also the founder of the Bank of Albania.
 Servet Libohova, former mayor of Tiranë
 Abedin Nepravishta, twice former mayor of Tirana, Albania, during 1933-1935 and 1937–1939
 Avni Rustemi, leftist activist of the 1920s.
 Nexhmie Zaimi, Albanian American author and journalist

References 

 
Municipalities in Gjirokastër County
Administrative units of Libohovë
Towns in Albania